Vaidehi Parashurami (born 1 February 1992) is an Indian actress. She made her debut with Mahesh Kothare's movie Ved Lavi Jeeva in 2010.

Early life 
Vaidehi was raised in Mumbai. She did her schooling from Indian Education Society's English Medium School located in Hindu colony, Dadar East in Mumbai. She attended junior college at Ramniranjan Anandilal Podar College of Commerce and Economics in Mumbai.  She holds a degree in B. A. with English literature from Ramnarain Ruia College & also completed her L. L. B. from New Law College, Mumbai. She is also a trained classical kathak dancer.

Career
She made her debut with Ved Lavi Jeeva opposite to Adinath Kothare in 2010. Later, she appeared in Kokanasatha. In 2016, she did a role in Wazir movie and also appeared in Vrundavan alongside Raqesh Bapat and Pooja Sawant. She appeared in multistarrer film FU: Friendship Unlimited (2017). In 2018, she got big break in Bollywood with Simmba Movie as Aakruti Dave. She was seen in Ani... Dr. Kashinath Ghanekar (2018) as Kanchan Ghanekar alongside Subodh Bhave. She played  Seema Joshi in the 2022 marathi film Zombivali.

Filmography

Films

Television

Awards and nominations

References

External links 

 Vaidehi Parashurami on IMDb

Living people
Indian film actresses
Actresses from Mumbai
21st-century Indian actresses
Actresses in Marathi cinema
Actresses in Hindi cinema
1992 births